Grissom Aeroplex  is a public/military airport in Miami and Cass counties, near Peru, Indiana. It is the civil redevelopment of the former Grissom Air Force Base, which was realigned as part of the 1991 Base Realignment and Closure Commission process.

Grissom Aeroplex consists of 850+ acres and existing buildings under control of Miami County Economic Development Authority. It opened as a general aviation airport since 1 March 2008 with no commercial airline service scheduled. Miami County Aviation serves as the fixed-base operator for the civilian airport operations.

Facilities 
Grissom has one runway designated 5/23 with an asphalt surface measuring 12,501 by 200 feet (3,810 x 61 m).

The two large aircraft aprons on the South of the approach end of runway 23 have been permanently deactivated and are used for semi-trailer storage and American autocross racing.

References

External links 
 
 

Airports in Indiana
Transportation buildings and structures in Cass County, Indiana
Transportation buildings and structures in Miami County, Indiana